The Chevron B4 was the second sports racing car to be developed and built by British manufacturer Chevron, in 1966. It was designed by British engineer, Derek Bennett. It was powered by a naturally-aspirated BMW M10 four-cylinder engine. Over its racing career, spanning two years, it only managed to score one class win, with its best race result being a 4th-place finish. Only one single model was built.

References

Chevron racing cars
Sports prototypes
24 Hours of Le Mans race cars
Group 4 (racing) cars
Sports racing cars